France Anne-Dominic Córdova (born August 5, 1947) is an American astrophysicist and administrator who was the fourteenth director of the National Science Foundation. Previously, she was the eleventh President of Purdue University from 2007 to 2012. She now serves as President of the Science Philanthropy Alliance.

Early years 
Córdova was born in  Paris, France, the eldest of twelve children. Her mother was Irish-American and her father was a Mexican-American West Point graduate and businessman. She attended high school at Bishop Amat High School in La Puente, California, east of Los Angeles and went on to Stanford University, where she graduated cum laude with a bachelor's degree in English and conducted anthropological field work in a Zapotec Indian pueblo in Oaxaca, Mexico. She earned a PhD in Physics from the California Institute of Technology in 1979.

Career
Córdova worked at the Space Astronomy and Astrophysics Group at the Los Alamos National Laboratory from 1979 to 1989, where she also served as Deputy Group Leader. She headed the Department of Astronomy and Astrophysics at Pennsylvania State University from 1989 to 1993. In 1993, Córdova became a NASA Chief Scientist.

Córdova then went to the University of California, Santa Barbara where she was Vice-Chancellor for Research and a Professor of Physics. In 2002 she was appointed Chancellor of the University of California, Riverside, where she was also a Distinguished Professor of Physics and Astronomy. Córdova led the initial steps toward establishing the UC Riverside School of Medicine.

Córdova became the eleventh president of Purdue University in 2007 and promoted student success and the commercialization of interdisciplinary research. Her administration oversaw the establishment of Purdue's College of Health and Human Sciences and its Global Policy Research Institute. At the end of her term, Purdue's trustees credited her with leading the school to record levels of research funding, reputational rankings, and student retention rates.

Córdova's scientific career contributions have been in the areas of observational and experimental astrophysics, multi-spectral research on x-ray and gamma ray sources, and space-borne instrumentation. She has published more than 150 scientific papers, most recently in 2007. In September 2007, she was appointed to the board of directors of BioCrossroads, Indiana's initiative to grow the life sciences through a public-private collaboration that supports the region's research and corporate strengths while encouraging new business development.

President Barack Obama appointed Córdova to the Board of Regents of the Smithsonian Institution in 2009, and she served until 2014. She was chair of the Board of Regents from 2012 to 2014.

In 2014, Córdova was nominated by President Obama and confirmed by the United States Senate as the 14th head of the National Science Foundation.

After her retirement from NSF, Córdova was elected to the Caltech Board of Trustees in June 2020. In May 2021, she was also named as President of the Science Philanthropy Alliance.

Personal life
Córdova is married to science educator Christian J. Foster, with whom she has two children, Anne-Catherine and Stephen.

Honors and awards
In 1996, received NASA's highest honor, the NASA Distinguished Service Medal. She was recognized as a 2000 Kilby Laureate, for "contributions to society through science, technology, innovation, invention, and education." She was named one of the 80 Elite Hispanic Women by Hispanic Business Magazine in 2002. In 2008, Córdova was nominated to the Stanford University Multicultural Alumni Hall of Fame by El Centro Chicano, Stanford's Chicano and Latino organization. She was appointed by President George W. Bush to the National Science Board in 2008. In 2012, she received the Women in Space Science Award from the Adler Planetarium.

Purdue University's France A. Córdova Recreational Sports Center was named for her in 2012. A 98-million-dollar renovation of the 55-year-old facility was approved during her presidency.  The building was one of 10 recreation facilities to receive a Facility of Merit Award for 2014 from Athletic Business.

Córdova is a fellow of the American Association for the Advancement of Science (AAAS), the Association for Women in Science (AWIS), and the American Academy of Arts and Sciences, and is a National Associate of the National Academies. She is an honorary member of the Royal Irish Academy. She has received numerous honorary doctorates, including from Loyola Marymount University in Los Angeles (1997), Ben Gurion University of the Negev (2011), Purdue University (2012), Duke University (2015), the University of Connecticut (2016), and Rochester Institute of Technology (2016).

References

External links

 Oral history interview transcript with France Córdova on 11 May 2020, American Institute of Physics, Niels Bohr Library & Archives
 UC Riverside Chancellor France A. Córdova Named Purdue University President 
 Purdue's new president 'out of this world' 
 Gale - Free Resources - Hispanic Heritage - Biographies - France Anne Córdova
 France Córdova  Video produced by Makers: Women Who Make America

|-

|-

 

1947 births
20th-century American astronomers
20th-century American women scientists
21st-century American astronomers
21st-century American women scientists
American academic administrators
American people of Irish descent
American people of Mexican descent
California Institute of Technology alumni
Chancellors of the University of California, Riverside
Hispanic and Latino American scientists
Living people
Los Alamos National Laboratory personnel
Members of the Royal Irish Academy
NASA people
Obama administration personnel
Pennsylvania State University faculty
People from La Puente, California
People from Los Angeles
Presidents of Purdue University
Smithsonian Institution people
Stanford University alumni
Trump administration personnel
United States National Science Foundation officials
University of California, Riverside faculty
University of California, Santa Barbara faculty
Women astronomers
Women heads of universities and colleges
Hispanic and Latino American physicists